Zeina Toukan is the Jordanian Minister of Planning and International Cooperation. She was appointed as minister on 27 October 2022.

Education 
Toukan holds a Bachelor of Economics from the American University in Cairo and a Master of Development Economics from the SOAS University of London.

References 

21st-century Jordanian politicians
Government ministers of Jordan
Jordanian politicians
Living people
Planning ministers of Jordan
The American University in Cairo alumni
Year of birth missing (living people)